Still the Orchestra Plays – Greatest Hits, Volume 1 & 2 is a greatest hits compilation album by American heavy metal band Savatage, released in 2010. The title for the compilation was taken from the lyrics in the title track to the band's 1989 release, Gutter Ballet. It was the first release of any kind by the band in almost nine years. The final three tracks on the second disc were brand new acoustic recordings made by Jon Oliva in 2009, featuring him on lead vocals. The set also featured the long-awaited official DVD release of the band's Japan Live '94 video, which until then had only existed on VHS and bootleg DVDs. The album peaked at No. 1 on the Greek Albums Chart in 2010.

Track listing

References

2010 compilation albums
Savatage albums
Edel Music albums
Albums produced by Paul O'Neill (rock producer)